The 1987–88 Dallas Sidekicks season was the fourth season of the Dallas Sidekicks indoor soccer club. The team entered the season as defending MISL champions. They made it back to the playoffs for the third consecutive year, but were unsuccessful in the defense of their title, losing in the first round. The team's average attendance for the season was 9,878, which is the franchise record to this day.

Roster

Schedule and results

Preseason

Regular season

Postseason

Final standings

y – division champions, x – clinched playoff berth

External links
 1987-88 Dallas Sidekicks season statistics at Kicks Fan fansite

Dallas Sidekicks (1984–2004) seasons
Dallas Sidekicks
Dallas Sidekicks